The 2017 All-Ireland Senior Camogie Championship – known as the Liberty Insurance All-Ireland Camogie Championship for sponsorship reasons – was 2017's premier inter-county camogie competition.

The winners receive the O'Duffy Cup.

The championship began on 10 June 2017 and ended on 10 September with a Cork victory.

Teams

The All-Ireland camogie championships are structured in three tiers -
 Ten county teams compete in the Senior Championship (tier 1)
 Twelve county teams compete in the Intermediate Championship (tier 2)
 Nine county teams compete in the Junior Championship (tier 3).

Nine of the senior camogie teams enter second teams in either the intermediate or junior championships. If the intermediate championship is won by a county's first team, that team is promoted to next year's senior championship. The winner of the junior championship is promoted to next year's intermediate championship provided that this does not result in two teams from the same county being in the same championship tier.

Senior Championship Teams –
 Clare
 Cork
 Dublin
 Galway
 Kilkenny
 Limerick
 Offaly
 Tipperary
 Waterford
 Wexford

Intermediate Championship Teams –
 Antrim
 Carlow
 Cork (second team)
 Derry
 Down
 Galway (second team)
 Kildare
 Kilkenny (second team)
 Laois
 Meath
 Tipperary (second team)
 Wexford (second team)

Junior Championship Teams –
 Armagh
 Clare (second team)
 Dublin (second team)
 Kerry
 Offaly (second team)
 Roscommon
 Waterford (second team)
 Westmeath
 Wicklow

Format

The senior championship begins with a group stage and progresses to a knock-out stage.

Group Stage

The ten teams are drawn into two groups of five. All the teams play each other once. Three points are awarded for a win and one for a draw.

Knock-out stage

The two group runners-up play the two third-placed teams in the two quarter-finals.
The two group winners play the two quarter-final winners in the two semi-finals.
The semi-final winners contest the 2017 All-Ireland Senior Camogie Championship Final

Group stage

Group 1

Group 2

Knock-out stage

Quarter-finals

Semi-finals

Final

References

External links
 Camogie Association
http://www.camogie.ie/news.asp?id=5378

2017 in camogie
2017
2017